Winchell's Donuts House is an international doughnut company and coffeehouse chain founded by Verne Winchell on October 8, 1948, in Temple City, California. Currently, there are over 170 stores in 6 western states, as well as Guam, Saipan, and Saudi Arabia. Several stores also operated in Nagoya, Japan in the past, with most stores located inside Uny supermarkets, as Uny Co., Ltd. was the master franchise holder in Japan. It is headquartered in the City of Industry, California.

History

The chain's slogan is "Home of the Warm 'n Fresh Donut," and it claims to be the West Coast's largest doughnut chain. It also offers its customers a 14-doughnut dozen, as opposed to the standard baker's dozen of 13.

In 2004, Winchell's was purchased by Yum-Yum Donuts, a company which operates 70 donut shops under its own name, but continues to operate Winchell's shops under their name.

In the early 2000s, Winchell's closed its shops in Portland, Oregon and they were replaced by "Heavenly Donuts".

In 2005, it withdrew from the Kansas City area, and most locations became Krispy Kreme.

See also
 List of doughnut shops

References

External links 
 

Doughnut shops
Bakeries of California
Fast-food chains of the United States
Regional restaurant chains in the United States
Companies based in the City of Industry, California
Companies based in Los Angeles County, California
Restaurants established in 1948
1948 establishments in California
Economy of the Western United States
Restaurants in California
Restaurants in Saudi Arabia